Jacob Claesz van Utrecht, also named by his signature Jacobus Traiectensis  (c. 1479 – after 1525) was a Flemish early Renaissance painter who worked in Antwerp and Lübeck.

Life
Few details are known of Jacob van Utrecht's life. Research on this artist did not start before the end of 19th century.  He was probably born in Utrecht, although it is not certain.  It is assumed that he became a citizen of Antwerp around 1500 and he is recorded as a "free master craftsman" of the Guild of St Luke there from 1506 to 1512.

From 1519 to 1525 he is recorded as a member of the Leonardsbruderschaft ("Leonard's Brotherhood"), a religious confraternity of merchants in Lübeck among whose ranks the leaders of the Protestant Reformation in the 1530s could be found.

From then on no traces of his life have been found.

Signature
In addition to Jacobus Traiectensis he also signed his artworks with his real surname Claesz / Claez.

Works
 Berlin altar (1513), Gemäldegalerie in Berlin
 Cologne altarpiece (1515), for the Great St. Martin Church in Cologne, now in the Wallraf-Richartz Museum
 Triptych (1520) for Lübeck merchant, Hinrich Kerckring, St. Annen Museum in Lübeck
 Portrait of a young Lady from Lübeck (c. 1520), Louvre, Paris
 Portrait of a man with a little dog (c. 1520), Swedish National Museum of Fine Arts, Stockholm
 Portrait Johann Wigerick (1522), Herdringen Palace near Arnsberg, (Sauerland)
 Portrait of a man writing a letter (1524), Gemäldegalerie, Berlin
 Portrait of a man with rings (1524), Hermitage Museum, St. Petersburg, Russia
 Crucifixion altar (ca. 1525), in Nødebo in the north of Zealand, Denmark
 Trinity altar (1525) for St. Mary's Church in Lübeck, lost in World War II bomb raid
 Annunciation altar with portraits of donating Lübeck merchant Hermann Plönnies and his wife, formerly in the Reedtz-Thott Collection at Gavnø Castle on the isle of Gavnø near Næstved on southern Zealand, since 2012 in the St. Annen Museum in Lübeck

References

External links
 

16th-century Flemish painters
Early Netherlandish painters
Culture in Lübeck
Artists from Utrecht
Painters from Antwerp
Flemish Renaissance painters
Year of birth uncertain
Year of death unknown